Serbia was a prison for women, located in Warsaw at 26 Dzielnej Street adjacent to the Pawiak prison. It was built by the Russian occupiers of Poland.

History

The building was built between 1830 and 1835 to be a criminal prison for women. From 1877 to 1878 it served as a military hospital, and acquired its name because of the Russo-Turkish War (1877–78) (also known as the Serbian war). After 1863 the building was a political prison for women, and among the prisoners were, Hanka Ordonówna, Ina Benita, Irena Iłłakowicz, Lidia Wysocka, Maja Berezowska, Maria Koszutska, Maria Rutkiewicz, Mary Berg, Nathalie Zand, Pola Gojawiczyńska, Teresa Bogusławska, Zofia Chądzyńska, and Zofia Kossak-Szczucka.

From 1939 to 1944, Serbia together with the adjacent Pawiak were seized by the Nazi Gestapo and continued to help in the repression of Warsaw. On 21 August 1944 the Germans blew up the two prisons.

After the war the area of women's prison was partially used for the construction of Marchlewskiego Street (today Jan Pawla II Avenue). In 1965, a plaque was placed commemorating the place which housed the "Serbia" prison.

Bibliography

 Encyklopedia Warszawy (in Polish), edited by Bartłomieja Kaczorowski. Ed. I PWN. Warsaw 1994. , p 623

External links
 Serbia in the architecture of pre-war Warsaw (in Polish)

Defunct prisons in Poland
History of Warsaw
Warsaw Uprising
Warsaw concentration camp
1830s establishments in Poland
1944 disestablishments in Poland